The Buddha of Suburbia (1990) is a novel by English author Hanif Kureishi, which won the Whitbread Award for the best first novel. The novel has been translated into 20 languages and was also made into a four-part drama series by the BBC in 1993. The soundtrack for the BBC drama was written and performed by David Bowie, who was a fan of the novel and shared the same Bromley home town as author Kureishi.

Plot
The Buddha of Suburbia is said to be very autobiographical. It is about Karim, a mixed-race teenager, who is desperate to escape suburban South London and to have new experiences in London in the 1970s. He eagerly seizes an unlikely opportunity when a life in the theatre presents itself as a possibility. When there is nothing left for him to do in London, he goes to New York for ten months. Returning to London, he takes on a part in a TV soap opera and the book leaves its reader on the brink of the 1979 general election (the defeat of Jim Callaghan's government on a motion of no confidence is specifically mentioned later in the novel).

Through his work with two theatre companies, Karim gets to know new people from completely different backgrounds, like the working-class Welshman Terry, who is an active Trotskyist and wants him to join the party, or Karim's lover Eleanor, who is upper middle class but pretends to be working class. Mixing with the people surrounding Eleanor and Pyke (a strange theatre director), he realises that they are speaking a different language, because they received a good education, which was not valued in the suburbs.

Other characters and their struggles to make it in London are described, too. Kureishi portrays Eva as a social climber at war with the city: "Eva was planning her assault on London. […] she was not ignored by London once she started her assault. She was climbing ever higher, day by day. […] As Eva started to take London, moving forward over the foreign fields of Islington, Chiswick and Wandsworth inch by inch, party by party, contact by contact". Later in the novel the main character's father (an Indian immigrant, a boring bureaucrat living with his family in a grey London suburb) is suddenly discovered by London's high society, which is hungry for exotic distractions, and so he becomes their Buddha-like guru, though he himself does not believe in this role. His son does not believe in him either and, at the same time, has his first erotic experiences.

Style
Due to the orality in The Buddha, the historical events, and the many dialogues full of colloquialism, the reader gets the impression of realism. The novel is highly episodic; Kureishi uses juxtaposition and collage.            The suburbs are "a leaving place" from which Kureishi's characters must move away. To Karim, London—even though it is geographically not far away from his home—seems like a completely different world. Therefore, his expectations of the city are great.

In The Buddha the move into (and later through) the city is like an odyssey or pilgrimage. On the first page Karim introduces himself as follows: "My name is Karim Amir, and I am an Englishman born and bred, almost". This motif is reinforced throughout the novel.

Pop music is an important theme in Kureishi's novels. One could even say that his novels have a soundtrack. London itself is associated by Karim to a sound. "There was a sound that London had. It was, I'm afraid, people in Hyde Park playing bongos with their hands; there was also the keyboard on The Doors' "Light My Fire". There were kids in velvet cloaks who lived free lives".     Within the problems of prejudice and racism lies one of the themes of initiation novels: the question of identity. Furthermore, London seems to be the perfect setting for the protagonists' "often painful growth towards maturity through a range of conflicts and dilemmas, social, sexual and political." (Bart Moore-Gilbert, 2001, 113) These characterisations mark Kureishi's novels as examples of Bildungsromane and novels of initiation.

Even though The Buddha is set in the 1970s and ends just before the Thatcher era begins, Kureishi was writing it under the direct influence of the outcome of Thatcherism. It is not surprising then, looking back, that he can see the roots of Thatcherite conservatism already in the '70s.

Awards and recognition
In 1990 The Buddha of Suburbia won the Whitbread Award for the best first novel. In 2009 Wasafiri magazine placed the novel on its list of 25 Most Influential Books published in the previous quarter-century.

Further reading 
Moore-Gilbert, B.: Hanif Kureishi. In the series 'Contemporary World Writers'. (Manchester: Manchester University Press, 2001) [ (hardback);  (paperback)]. A treatment of Kureishi's oeuvre up to 1999, including a chapter on The Buddha and The Black Album.

References

External links 
 Hanif Kureishi discusses The Buddha of Suburbia on the BBC World Book Club
 Susie Thomas article on the London of The Buddha of Suburbia
The Buddha of Suburbia at the British Library - includes related articles, videos and items from Kureishi's archive

1990 British novels
Novels by Hanif Kureishi
Costa Book Award-winning works
Novels set in London
Postcolonial novels
Novels about actors
Faber and Faber books
Novels with bisexual themes